Het Wonderlijke leven van Willem Parel  is a 1955 Dutch comedy film directed by Gerard Rutten. It revolves around Wim Sonneveld's comedy character Willem Parel.

Cast
Wim Sonneveld	... 	Wim Sonneveld / Willem Parel
Peronne Hosang	... 	Hermine Toets van Slinderen
Femke Boersma	... 	Angèle (as Femke Talma)
Hans Kaart	... 	Huipie
Herbert Joeks	... 	Directeur van Radio Omroep 'De Windwijzer'
Bert van der Linden		
Joop Doderer	... 	De Groninger
Rijk de Gooyer	... 	Pianist
Thom Kelling	... 	De Hagenaar
Ben Aerden		
Jan Apon	... 	Rechercheur
Philippe La Chapelle		
Dina Diependaal		
J. Ellerbrak		
Frits Engels
Will Hollenga  barman

External links 
 

1955 films
Dutch black-and-white films
Dutch comedy films
1955 comedy films
Films directed by Gerard Rutten